Chloë Victoria Annett (born 25 July 1971) is an English actress. She played Holly Turner in Crime Traveller and Kristine Kochanski in series 7 and 8 of the sitcom Red Dwarf.

Biography

Early life and family
Annett was born and brought up in East Finchley in London, where she attended Mountview Theatre School. Originally, she was going to attend an art school but she went along with one of her friends who had an audition and got in. She reports that her parents were supportive of her career change and encouraged her.

Her father was director Paul Annett, who directed a large number of episodes of the soap opera EastEnders. Annett's father also directed some episodes of children's drama series Byker Grove, in some of which Annett appeared. Her brother, Jamie Annett, has also directed EastEnders. Her mother is actress and voice expert Margo Annett, author of An Actor's Guide to Auditions and Interviews, who works closely with Thelma Holt and the Cameron Mackintosh foundation. She is married to Alec McKinlay, the manager for the rock groups Oasis and Crowded House, with whom she has three children.

Television
Annett has spent time in America, where she had a part in the 1992 TV miniseries Jewels. Back in Britain, most of her roles were bit parts, although she played the starring role of Holly Turner in Crime Traveller in 1997 alongside Michael French, who played Jeff Slade. In 1992, she played the part of Gertrude Winkworth in one episode of the Granada's series Jeeves and Wooster, based on the novels of P.G. Wodehouse, in which Hugh Laurie and Stephen Fry starred. She also played Angela Mortimer, the great-niece of Mrs Pumphrey and the love interest of Tristan Farnon, in one episode ("Hampered") of All Creatures Great and Small.

Annett played Kristine Kochanski in the seventh and eighth series of the science fiction comedy television series Red Dwarf, a role which she reprised in the final part of the 2009 special, Red Dwarf: Back to Earth.

She won Best Actress at the April 2011 London Independent Film Festival.

Selected filmography

References

External links

 .

English soap opera actresses
English television actresses
1971 births
Living people
People from East Finchley
Actresses from London
20th-century English actresses
21st-century English actresses